Greg Ellis (born 21 March 1968) is an English actor.

Career 
Born Jonny Rees in England, Ellis came over to the United States around 1995 or 1996, and had lived there ever since.

On the big screen, Ellis is known for appearing alongside Leonardo DiCaprio and Kate Winslet in Titanic as well as Brad Pitt and Angelina Jolie in Mr. and Mrs. Smith. He is also known for appearing in J.J. Abrams's Star Trek as Chief Engineer Olsen, the original chief engineer of the Starship Enterprise, as well as starred in the western Forsaken alongside Demi Moore with Donald Sutherland and Brian Cox.

Ellis is best known for his portrayal of Lieutenant Theodore Groves in Disney's Pirates of the Caribbean film series. Though his character wasn't named onscreen, Ellis was credited as "Officer" in the first and third films, and the name "Groves" was used in the third film's screenplay and the fourth film, the latter of which he was called "Lieutenant Commander Groves" onscreen. Due to his involvement in the franchise, Ellis kept in touch with Johnny Depp, Geoffrey Rush, and Kevin McNally.

On television, Ellis joined the cast of Hawaii Five-0 in season five to play Thomas Farrow in a major recurring arc, was a regular on the Fox drama Touch as Trevor Wilcox and played the villainous Michael Amador opposite Kiefer Sutherland in the 3rd season of the hit series 24. His other television credits include: Dexter, The X-Files, Magnum PI, The Riches, Bones, Alcatraz, Star Trek: Deep Space Nine, The Closer, CSI, Nip/Tuck, Perception, Knight Rider, Days of Our Lives, Trust Me and many more.

As a voice-over actor, Ellis has a career in video games and animation. His voice was featured in the PlayStation 2 games Rogue Galaxy (as Simon Wicard), Dirge of Cerberus: Final Fantasy VII (as Cait Sith), and Tomb Raider: Legend (as Alister Fletcher), as well as in Dragon Age: Origins, Dragon Age II, and Dragon Age: Inquisition (as Cullen Rutherford). His minor video game work includes voices for SOCOM II U.S. Navy SEALs, SOCOM 3 U.S. Navy SEALs, Star Wars: Knights of the Old Republic II: The Sith Lords, Tomb Raider: Underworld, and Ty the Tasmanian Tiger. He has also voiced characters in cartoons such as The Grim Adventures of Billy & Mandy, Invader Zim, Batman: The Brave and the Bold, and first three series of the Ben 10 franchise. He even voiced Dr. Morocco in season two of Transformers: Rescue Bots where the character was originally voiced by Tim Curry. He has voiced Mzingo in the Disney series The Lion Guard and Jet-Vac in the Netflix animated series Skylanders Academy, as well as Valen Rudor in the Disney animated series Star Wars Rebels.

Ellis played Cmdr. Giles Price in the game Command & Conquer: Red Alert 3 and reprised the role in Command & Conquer: Red Alert 3 – Uprising. He reprised his role as Cait Sith in the English version of the CGI film Final Fantasy VII: Advent Children. He voiced Garmund in the Robert Zemeckis animated film, Beowulf. Ellis originally started in musicals and originated the role of Rusty in Starlight Express at the Apollo Victoria Theatre and was the alternate Chris in the original cast of Miss Saigon at the Theatre Royal, Drury Lane. He also appears on the cast recording of the new Starlight Express. He released a single from the show, "Next Time You Fall in Love."

Ellis wrote a book in 2021, titled The Respondent: Exposing the Cartel of Family Law about "a first-person account of family breakdown and the social, political, and legal forces that are fuelling a national health emergency". He founded the CPU: Children and Parents United in 2021 to promote these issues. His most recent work is the 2023 video game Hogwarts Legacy, as Albie Weekes and Timothy Teasdale.

Filmography

Live-action roles

Film

Television

Video games

Voice roles

Animation

Film

Video games

References

External links 
 
 
 

1968 births
Living people
English male film actors
English male television actors
English male video game actors
English male voice actors
Male actors from Greater Manchester
People from Wigan
20th-century English male actors
21st-century English male actors